Xi'an Medical University is a medical university in Xi'an, Shaanxi, China. The university was founded in 1951.

External links
Official Website of Xi'an Medical University

Universities and colleges in Xi'an
1951 establishments in China
Educational institutions established in 1951